This is a list of mathematics-based methods.

Adams' method (differential equations)
Akra–Bazzi method (asymptotic analysis)
Bisection method (root finding)
Brent's method (root finding)
Condorcet method (voting systems)
Coombs' method (voting systems)
Copeland's method (voting systems)
Crank–Nicolson method (numerical analysis)
D'Hondt method (voting systems)
D21 – Janeček method (voting system)
Discrete element method (numerical analysis)
Domain decomposition method (numerical analysis)
Epidemiological methods
Euler's forward method
Explicit and implicit methods (numerical analysis)
Finite difference method (numerical analysis)
Finite element method (numerical analysis)
Finite volume method (numerical analysis)
Highest averages method (voting systems)
Method of exhaustion
Method of infinite descent (number theory)
Information bottleneck method
Inverse chain rule method (calculus)
Inverse transform sampling method (probability)
Iterative method (numerical analysis)
Jacobi method (linear algebra)
Largest remainder method (voting systems)
Level-set method
Linear combination of atomic orbitals molecular orbital method (molecular orbitals)
Method of characteristics
Least squares method (optimization, statistics)
Maximum likelihood method (statistics)
Method of complements (arithmetic)
Method of moving frames (differential geometry)
Method of successive substitution (number theory)
Monte Carlo method (computational physics, simulation)
Newton's method (numerical analysis)
Pemdas method (order of operation)
Perturbation methods (functional analysis, quantum theory)
Probabilistic method (combinatorics)
Romberg's method (numerical analysis)
Runge–Kutta method (numerical analysis)
Sainte-Laguë method (voting systems)
Schulze method (voting systems)
Sequential Monte Carlo method
Simplex method
Spectral method (numerical analysis)
Variational methods (mathematical analysis, differential equations)
Welch's method

See also
 Automatic basis function construction
 List of graphical methods
 Scientific method

Methods
Scientific method